Sir Ridley Scott (born 30 November 1937) is an English film director and producer. Best known for directing films in the science fiction and historical drama genres, his work is known for its atmospheric and highly concentrated visual style. Scott has received many accolades throughout his career, including the BAFTA Fellowship for lifetime achievement from the British Academy of Film and Television Arts in 2018. In 2003, he was knighted by Queen Elizabeth II for services to the British film industry. He was inducted into the Science Fiction Hall of Fame in 2007, and received a star on the Hollywood Walk of Fame in 2011.

An alumnus of the Royal College of Art in London, Scott began his career in television as a designer and director before moving into advertising, where he honed his filmmaking skills by making mini-films for television commercials. He made his debut as a film director with The Duellists (1977) and gained wider recognition with his next film, Alien (1979). Three years later he would direct Blade Runner, which Scott calls his "most complete and personal film". Though his films range widely in setting and period, they frequently showcase memorable imagery of urban environments, spanning 2nd-century Rome in Gladiator (2000), 12th-century Jerusalem in Kingdom of Heaven (2005), Medieval England in Robin Hood (2010), Ancient Memphis in Exodus: Gods and Kings (2014), contemporary Mogadishu in Black Hawk Down (2001), or the futuristic cityscapes of Blade Runner and different planets in Alien, Prometheus (2012), The Martian (2015) and Alien: Covenant (2017). Several of his films are also known for their strong female characters, such as Thelma & Louise (1991).

Scott has been nominated for three Academy Awards for Directing, which he received for Thelma & Louise, Gladiator and Black Hawk Down. Gladiator won the Academy Award for Best Picture, and he received a nomination in the same category for The Martian. In 1995, both Scott and his brother Tony received a British Academy Film Award for Outstanding British Contribution to Cinema. In a 2004 BBC poll, Scott was ranked 10 on the list of most influential people in British culture.

Early life

Scott was born on 30 November 1937 in South Shields, County Durham to Elizabeth and Colonel Francis Percy Scott. His grand-uncle Dixon Scott was a pioneer of the cinema chain and opened many cinemas around Tyneside. One of his cinemas, Tyneside Cinema, is still operating in Newcastle and is the last remaining newsreel cinema in the UK. Born two years before World War II began, Scott was brought up in a military family. His father, an officer in the Royal Engineers, was absent for most of his early life. His elder brother, Frank, joined the Merchant Navy when he was still young and the pair had little contact. During this time the family moved around; they lived in Cumberland as well as other areas in England, in addition to Wales and Germany. Scott's younger brother, Tony, also became a film director. After the war the Scott family moved back to County Durham and eventually settled on Teesside.

His interest in science fiction began by reading the novels of H. G. Wells as a child. He was also influenced by science-fiction films such as It! The Terror from Beyond Space, The Day the Earth Stood Still, and Them! He said these films "kind of got [him] going a little" but his attention was not fully caught until he saw Stanley Kubrick's 2001: A Space Odyssey, about which he said, "Once I saw that, I knew what I could do." He went to Grangefield Grammar School in Stockton on Tees and obtained a diploma in design at West Hartlepool College of Art. The industrial landscape in West Hartlepool would later inspire visuals in Blade Runner, with Scott stating, "There were steelworks adjacent to West Hartlepool, so every day I'd be going through them, and thinking they're kind of magnificent, beautiful, winter or summer, and the darker and more ominous it got, the more interesting it got."

Scott went on to study at the Royal College of Art in London, contributing to the college magazine ARK and helping to establish the college film department. For his final show, he made a black and white short film, Boy and Bicycle, starring both his younger brother and his father (the film was later released on the "Extras" section of The Duellists DVD). In February 1963, Scott was named in the title credits as "Designer" for the BBC television programme Tonight. After graduation in 1963, he secured a job as a trainee set designer with the BBC, leading to work on the popular television police series Z-Cars and science fiction series Out of the Unknown. He was originally assigned to design the second Doctor Who serial, The Daleks, which would have entailed realising the serial's eponymous alien creatures. However, shortly before he was due to start work, a schedule conflict meant he was replaced by Raymond Cusick. In 1965, he began directing episodes of television series for the BBC, only one of which, an episode of Adam Adamant Lives!, is available commercially.

In 1968, Ridley and Tony Scott founded Ridley Scott Associates (RSA), a film and commercial production company. Working alongside Alan Parker, Hugh Hudson and cinematographer Hugh Johnson, Ridley Scott made many commercials at RSA during the 1970s, including a 1973 Hovis bread advertisement, "Bike Round" (underscored by the slow movement of Dvořák's "New World" symphony rearranged for brass), filmed in Gold Hill, Shaftesbury, Dorset. A nostalgia themed television advert that captured the public imagination, it was voted the UK's favourite commercial in a 2006 poll. In the 1970s the Chanel No. 5 brand needed revitalisation having run the risk of being labelled as mass market and passé. Directed by Scott in the 1970s and 1980s, Chanel television commercials were inventive mini-films with production values of surreal fantasy and seduction, which "played on the same visual imagery, with the same silhouette of the bottle."

Five members of the Scott family are directors, and all have worked for RSA. His brother Tony was a successful film director whose career spanned more than two decades; his sons Jake and Luke are both acclaimed directors of commercials, as is his daughter, Jordan Scott. Jake and Jordan both work from Los Angeles; Luke is based in London. In 1995, Shepperton Studios was purchased by a consortium headed by Ridley and Tony Scott, which extensively renovated the studios while also expanding and improving its grounds.

Career

1970s: The Duellists, Alien
The Duellists (1977) marked Ridley Scott's first feature film as director. Shot in Europe, it was nominated for the main prize at the Cannes Film Festival, and won an award for Best Debut Film. The Duellists had limited commercial impact internationally. Set during the Napoleonic Wars, it follows two French Hussar officers, D'Hubert and Feraud (Keith Carradine and Harvey Keitel) whose quarrel over an initially minor incident turns into a bitter extended feud spanning fifteen years, interwoven with the larger conflict that provides its backdrop. The film has been acclaimed for providing a historically authentic portrayal of Napoleonic uniforms and military conduct. The 2013 release of the film on Blu-ray coincided with the publication of an essay on the film in a collection of scholarly essays on Scott.

Scott had originally planned next to adapt a version of Tristan and Iseult, but after seeing Star Wars, he became convinced of the potential of large scale, effects-driven films. He accepted the job of directing Alien, the 1979 horror/science-fiction film that would win him international success. Scott made the decision to switch Ellen Ripley from the standard male action hero to a heroine. Ripley (played by Sigourney Weaver), who appeared in the first four Alien films, would become a cinematic icon. The final scene of John Hurt's character has been named by a number of publications as one of the most memorable in cinematic history. Filmed at Shepperton Studios in England, Alien was the sixth highest-grossing film of 1979, earning over $104 million worldwide. Scott was involved in the 2003 restoration and re-release of the original film. In promotional interviews at the time, Scott indicated he had been in discussions to make a fifth film in the Alien franchise. However, in a 2006 interview, Scott remarked that he had been unhappy about Alien: The Director's Cut, feeling that the original was "pretty flawless" and that the additions were merely a marketing tool. Scott later returned to Alien-related projects when he directed Prometheus and Alien: Covenant three decades after the original film's release.

1980s: Blade Runner and other films 

After a year working on the film adaptation of Dune, and following the sudden death of his brother Frank, Scott signed to direct the film version of Philip K. Dick's novel Do Androids Dream of Electric Sheep? Re-titled Blade Runner and starring Harrison Ford, the film was a commercial disappointment in cinemas in 1982, but is now regarded as a classic. In 1991, Scott's notes were used by Warner Bros. to create a rushed director's cut which removed the main character's voiceover and made a number of other small changes, including to the ending. Later Scott personally supervised a digital restoration of Blade Runner and approved what was called The Final Cut. This version was released in Los Angeles, New York City and Toronto cinemas on 5 October 2007, and as an elaborate DVD release in December 2007.

Today, Blade Runner is ranked by many critics as one of the most important and influential science fiction films ever made, partly thanks to its much imitated portraits of a future cityscape. It is often discussed along with William Gibson's novel Neuromancer as initiating the cyberpunk genre. Stephen Minger, stem cell biologist at King's College London, states, "It was so far ahead of its time and the whole premise of the story – what is it to be human and who are we, where we come from? It's the age-old questions." Scott has described Blade Runner as his "most complete and personal film".

In 1985, Scott directed Legend, a fantasy film produced by Arnon Milchan. Scott decided to create a "once upon a time" tale set in a world of princesses, unicorns and goblins, filming almost entirely inside the studio. Scott cast Tom Cruise as the film's hero, Jack; Mia Sara as Princess Lili; and Tim Curry as the Satan-horned Lord of Darkness. Scott had a forest set built on the 007 Stage at Pinewood Studios in Buckinghamshire, with trees 60 feet high and trunks 30 feet in diameter. In the final stages of filming, the forest set was destroyed by fire; Jerry Goldsmith's original score was used for European release, but replaced in North America with a score by Tangerine Dream. Rob Bottin provided the film's Academy Award-nominated make-up effects, most notably Curry's red-coloured Satan figure. Despite a major commercial failure on release, the film has gone on to become a cult classic. The 2002 Director's Cut restored Goldsmith's original score.

Scott made Someone to Watch Over Me, a romantic thriller starring Tom Berenger and Mimi Rogers in 1987, and Black Rain (1989), a police drama starring Michael Douglas and Andy García, shot partially in Japan. Both achieved mild success at the box office. Black Rain was the first of Scott's six collaborations with the composer Hans Zimmer.

"1984" Apple Macintosh commercial

In 1984, Scott directed a big-budget ($900,000) television commercial, "1984", to launch Apple Computer's Macintosh computer. Scott filmed the advertisement in England for about $370,000; which was given a showcase airing in the US on 22 January 1984, during Super Bowl XVIII, alongside screenings in cinemas. Some consider this advertisement a "watershed event" in advertising and a "masterpiece". Advertising Age placed it top of its list of the 50 greatest commercials.

Set in a dystopian future modelled after George Orwell's Nineteen Eighty-Four, Scott's advertisement used its heroine (portrayed by English athlete Anya Major) to represent the coming of the Macintosh (indicated by her white tank top adorned with a picture of the Apple Macintosh computer) as a means of saving humanity from "conformity" (Big Brother), an allusion to IBM, at that time the dominant force in computing.

1990s: Thelma & Louise 
The road film Thelma & Louise (1991) starring Geena Davis as Thelma, Susan Sarandon as Louise, in addition to the breakthrough role for Brad Pitt as J.D, proved to be one of Scott's biggest critical successes, helping revive the director's reputation and receiving his first nomination for the Academy Award for Best Director. His next project, independently funded historical epic 1492: Conquest of Paradise, was a box office failure. The film recounts the expeditions to the Americas by Christopher Columbus (French star Gérard Depardieu). Scott did not release another film for four years.

In 1995, Ridley and his brother Tony formed a production company, Scott Free Productions, in Los Angeles. All Ridley's subsequent feature films, starting with White Squall (starring Jeff Bridges) and G.I. Jane (starring Demi Moore), have been produced under the Scott Free banner. In 1995 the two brothers purchased a controlling interest in the British film studio Shepperton Studios. In 2001, Shepperton merged with Pinewood Studios to become The Pinewood Studios Group, which is headquartered in Buckinghamshire, England.

2000s 
Scott's historical drama Gladiator (2000) proved to be one of his biggest critical and commercial successes. It won five Academy Awards, including Best Picture, Best Actor for the film's star Russell Crowe, and saw Scott nominated for the Academy Award for Best Director. Scott worked with British visual effects company The Mill for the film's computer-generated imagery, and the film was dedicated to Oliver Reed who died during filming – The Mill created a digital body double for Reed's remaining scenes. Some have credited Gladiator  with reviving the nearly defunct "sword and sandal" historical genre. The film was named the fifth best action film of all time in the ABC special Best in Film: The Greatest Movies of Our Time.

Scott directed Hannibal (2001) starring Anthony Hopkins as Hannibal Lecter. The film was commercially successful despite receiving mixed reviews. Scott's next film, Black Hawk Down (2001), featuring Tom Hardy in his film debut, was based on a group of stranded US soldiers fighting for their lives in Somalia; Scott was nominated for an Oscar for Best Director. In 2003, Scott directed a smaller scale project, Matchstick Men, adapted from the novel by Eric Garcia and starring Nicolas Cage, Sam Rockwell and Alison Lohman. It received mostly positive reviews but performed moderately at the box office.

In 2005, he made the modestly successful Kingdom of Heaven, a film about the Crusades. The film starred Orlando Bloom, and marked Scott's first collaboration with the composer Harry Gregson-Williams. The Moroccan government sent the Moroccan cavalry as extras for some battle scenes. Unhappy with the theatrical version of Kingdom of Heaven (which he blamed on paying too much attention to the opinions of preview audiences in addition to relenting when Fox wanted 45 minutes shaved off), Scott supervised a director's cut of the film, the true version of what he wanted, which was released on DVD in 2006. The director's cut of Kingdom of Heaven has been met with critical acclaim, with Empire magazine calling the film an "epic", adding: "The added 45 minutes in the director’s cut are like pieces missing from a beautiful but incomplete puzzle." "This is the one that should have gone out" reflected Scott. Asked if he was against previewing in general in 2006, Scott stated: "It depends who's in the driving seat. If you've got a lunatic doing my job, then you need to preview. But a good director should be experienced enough to judge what he thinks is the correct version to go out into the cinema."

Scott teamed up again with Gladiator star Russell Crowe for A Good Year, based on the best-selling book by Peter Mayle about an investment banker who finds a new life in Provence. The film was released on 10 November 2006. A few days later Rupert Murdoch, chairman of studio 20th Century Fox (who backed the film) dismissed A Good Year as "a flop" at a shareholders' meeting.

Scott's next film was American Gangster, based on the story of real-life drug kingpin Frank Lucas. Scott took over the project in early 2006 and had screenwriter Steven Zaillian rewrite his script to focus on the dynamic between Frank Lucas and Richie Roberts. Denzel Washington signed on to the project as Lucas, with Russell Crowe co-starring as Roberts. The film premiered in November 2007 to positive reviews and box office success, and Scott was nominated for a Golden Globe for Best Director.

In late 2008, Scott's espionage thriller Body of Lies, starring Leonardo DiCaprio and Russell Crowe, opened to lukewarm ticket-sales and mixed reviews. Scott directed a revisionist adaptation of Robin Hood, which starred Russell Crowe as Robin Hood and Cate Blanchett as Maid Marian. It was released in May 2010 to mixed reviews, but a respectable box-office.

On 31 July 2009, news surfaced of a two-part prequel to Alien with Scott attached to direct. The project, ultimately reduced to a single film called Prometheus, which Scott described as sharing "strands of Aliens DNA" while not being a direct prequel, was released in June 2012. The film starred Charlize Theron and Michael Fassbender, with Noomi Rapace playing the leading role of the scientist named Elizabeth Shaw. The film received mostly positive reviews and grossed $403 million at the box office.

In August 2009, Scott planned to direct an adaptation of Aldous Huxley's Brave New World set in a dystopian London with Leonardo DiCaprio. In 2009, the TV series The Good Wife premiered with Ridley and his brother Tony credited as executive producers.

2010s 
On 6 July 2010, YouTube announced the launch of Life in a Day, an experimental documentary executive produced by Scott. Released at the Sundance Film Festival on 27 January 2011, it incorporates footage shot on 24 July 2010 submitted by YouTube users from around the world. As part of the buildup to the 2012 London Olympics, Scott produced Britain in a Day, a documentary film consisting of footage shot by the British public on 12 November 2011.

In 2012, Scott produced the commercial for Lady Gaga's fragrance, "Fame." It was touted as the first ever black Eau de Parfum, in the informal credits attached to the trailer for this advertisement. On 24 June 2013, Scott's series Crimes of the Century debuted on CNN. In November 2012 it was announced that Scott would produce the documentary, Springsteen & I directed by Baillie Walsh and inspired by Life in a Day, which Scott also produced. The film featured fan footage from throughout the world on what musician Bruce Springsteen meant to them and how he impacted their lives. The film was released for one day only in 50 countries and on over 2000 film screens on 22 July 2013.

Scott directed The Counselor (2013), with a screenplay by author Cormac McCarthy. On 25 October 2013, Indiewire reported that "Before McCarthy sold his first spec script for Scott's (The Counselor) film, the director was heavily involved in developing an adaptation of the author's 1985 novel Blood Meridian with screenwriter Bill Monahan (The Departed). But as Scott said in a Time Out interview, '[Studios] didn't want to make it. The book is so uncompromising, which is what's great about it.' Described as an 'anti-western'..." Scott directed the biblically inspired epic film Exodus: Gods and Kings, released in December 2014 which received negative reviews from critics (particularly for the casting of white actors as Middle Eastern characters) and grossed $268 million on a $140 million budget. Filmed at Pinewood Studios in Buckinghamshire, the film starred Christian Bale in the lead role.

In May 2014, Scott began negotiations to direct The Martian, starring Matt Damon as Mark Watney. Like many of Scott's previous works, The Martian features a heroine in the form of Jessica Chastain's character who is the mission commander. The film was originally scheduled for release on 25 November 2015, but Fox later switched its release date with that of Victor Frankenstein, and thus The Martian was released on 2 October 2015.  The Martian was a critical and commercial success, grossed over $630 million worldwide, becoming Scott's highest-grossing film to date.

A sequel to Prometheus, Alien: Covenant, started filming in 2016, premiered in London on 4 May 2017, and received general release on 19 May 2017. The film received generally positive reviews from critics, with many praising Michael Fassbender's dual performance and calling the film a return to form for both director Ridley Scott and the franchise.

In August 2011, information leaked about production of a sequel to Blade Runner by Alcon Entertainment, with Alcon partners Broderick Johnson and Andrew Kosove. Scott informed the Variety publication in November 2014 that he was no longer the director for the film and would only fulfill a producer's role. Scott also revealed that filming would begin sometime within 2015, and that Harrison Ford has signed on to reprise his role from the original film but his character should only appear in "the third act" of the sequel. On 26 February 2015, the sequel was officially confirmed, with Denis Villeneuve hired to direct the film, and Scott being an executive producer. The sequel, Blade Runner 2049, was released on 6 October 2017 to universal acclaim.

From May to August 2017, Scott filmed All the Money in the World, a drama about the kidnapping of John Paul Getty III, starring Mark Wahlberg and Michelle Williams. Kevin Spacey originally portrayed Getty Sr. However, after multiple sexual assault allegations against the actor, Scott decided to replace him with Christopher Plummer, saying "You can't condone that kind of behaviour in any shape or form. We cannot let one person's action affect the good work of all these other people. It's that simple." Scott began re-shooting Spacey's scenes with Plummer on 20 November, which included filming at Elveden Hall in west Suffolk, England. With a release date of 25 December 2017, the film studio had its doubts that Scott would manage it, saying: "They were like, 'You'll never do it. God be with you.'"

 2020s 

In 2020, Scott directed The Last Duel, a film adaptation of Eric Jager's 2004 book The Last Duel: A True Story of Crime, Scandal, and Trial by Combat in Medieval France, starring Adam Driver, Matt Damon and Jodie Comer which was released on 15 October 2021 and bombed at the box office, grossing only $30.6 million against a production budget of $100 million. Filming locations included the French medieval castle of Berzé-le-Châtel (with a film crew of 300 people including 100 extras), and Ireland. 

In 2021, he directed House of Gucci, a film about the murder of Maurizio Gucci orchestrated by Patrizia Reggiani, who were portrayed by Adam Driver and Lady Gaga, respectively. The film was released in November 2021. Scott is next directing Napoleon, a biopic of Napoleon Bonaparte starring Joaquin Phoenix as Napoleon. Filming began in February 2022.

Television projects
Ridley Scott and his brother Tony produced CBS series Numb3rs (2005–10), a crime drama about a genius mathematician who helps the FBI solve crimes; and The Good Wife (2009–2016), a legal drama about an attorney balancing her job with her husband, a former state attorney trying to rebuild his political career after a major scandal. The two Scotts also produced a 2010 film adaptation of 1980s television show The A-Team, directed by Joe Carnahan.

Ridley Scott was an executive producer of the first season of Amazon's The Man in the High Castle (2015–16). Through Scott Free Productions, he is an executive producer on the dark comic science-fiction series BrainDead which debuted on CBS in 2016.

On 20 November 2017, Amazon agreed a deal with AMC Studios for a worldwide release of The Terror, Scott's series adaptation of Dan Simmons' novel, a speculative retelling of British explorer Sir John Franklin's lost expedition of HMS Erebus and HMS Terror to the Arctic in 1845–1848 to force the Northwest Passage, with elements of horror and supernatural fiction, and the series premiered in March 2018. Scott was an executive producer for the 2019 BBC/FX three-part miniseries A Christmas Carol.

Scott's first television directing role in 50 years, Raised by Wolves, was released on HBO Max in 2020. Scott said his “tendency was to think, ‘I don't want to go down that road of androids again'”, but decided to take on the project after he read the script and liked it. The show revolves around androids Mother and Father, who attempt to save humankind on planet Kepler-22b after earth is demolished by war between the Mithraic, who follow a god called Sol, and militant atheists.

Personal life

Ridley Scott was married to Felicity Heywood from 1964 to 1975. The couple had two sons, Jake and Luke, both of whom work as directors in Scott's production company, Ridley Scott Associates. Scott later married advertising executive Sandy Watson in 1979, with whom he had a daughter, Jordan Scott, also a director, and divorced in 1989. His current partner is actress Giannina Facio, whom he has cast in all his films since White Squall except American Gangster and The Martian, and whom he married in 2015. He divides his time between homes in London, France, and Los Angeles.

His eldest brother Frank died, aged 45, of skin cancer in 1980. His younger brother Tony, who was also his business partner in their company Scott Free, died on 19 August 2012 at the age of 68 after jumping from the Vincent Thomas Bridge which spans Los Angeles Harbour, after an originally disputed long struggle with cancer. Before Tony's death, he and Ridley collaborated on a miniseries based on Robin Cook's novel Coma for A&E. The two-part miniseries premiered on A&E on 3 September 2012, to mixed reviews.

Ridley has dedicated several of his films in memory of his family: Blade Runner to his brother Frank, Black Hawk Down to his mother, and The Counselor and Exodus: Gods and Kings to his brother Tony. Ridley also paid tribute to his late brother Tony at the 2016 Golden Globes, after his film, The Martian, won Best Motion Picture – Musical or Comedy.

In 2013, Ridley stated that he is an atheist. Although when asked by the BBC in a September 2014 interview if he believes in God, Scott replied:

Directorial style
Scott's frequent collaborator Russell Crowe commented, "I like being on Ridley's set because actors can perform [...] and the focus is on the performers." Paul M. Sammon, in his book Future Noir: The Making of Blade Runner, commented in an interview with Brmovie.com that Scott's relationship with his actors has improved considerably over the years. More recently during the filming of Scott's 2012 film, Prometheus, Charlize Theron praised the director's willingness to listen to suggestions from the cast for improvements in the way their characters are portrayed on screen. Theron worked alongside the writers and Scott to give more depth to her character during filming. When working on epics, Scott states, "there’s always the danger that the characters can get swamped" on a large canvas, before adding, "My model is David Lean, whose characters never got lost in the proscenium."

Scott's work is identified for its striking visuals, with heroines also a common theme. His visual style, incorporating a detailed approach to production design and innovative, atmospheric lighting, has been influential on a subsequent generation of filmmakers. James Cameron commented, "I love Ridley's films and I love his filmmaking, I love the beauty of the photography, I love the visceral sense that you're there, that you're present." Scott commonly uses slow pacing until the action sequences. Examples include Alien and Blade Runner; the Los Angeles Times critic Sheila Benson, for example, would call the latter "Blade Crawler" "because it's so damn slow". Scott claims to have an eidetic memory, which he says aids him in visualising and storyboarding the scenes in his films.

Scott has developed a method for filming intricate shots as swiftly as possible: "I like working, always, with a minimum of three cameras. [...] So those 50 set-ups [a day] might only be 25 set-ups except I'm covering in the set-up. So you're finished. I mean, if you take a little bit more time to prep on three cameras, or if it's a big stunt, eleven cameras, and – whilst it may take 45 minutes to set up – then when you're ready you say 'Action!', and you do three takes, two takes and is everybody happy? You say, 'Yeah, that's it.' So you move on."

Artificial intelligence is a theme that appears in several of Scott's films including Blade Runner, Alien, and Prometheus. The 2013 book The Culture and Philosophy of Ridley Scott identifies pioneering computer scientist Alan Turing and the philosopher John Searle as presenting relevant models of testing artificial intelligence known as the Turing test and the Chinese Room Thought Experiment, respectively, in the chapter titled "What's Wrong with Building Replicants," which has been a recurring theme for many of Scott's films. The chapter titled "Artificial Intelligence in Blade Runner, Alien, and Prometheus," concludes by citing the writings of John Stuart Mill in the context of Scott's Nexus-6 Replicants in Blade Runner (Rutger Hauer), the android Ash (Ian Holm) in Alien, and the android David 8 (Michael Fassbender) in Prometheus, where Mill is applied to assert that measures and tests of intelligence must also assess actions and moral behaviour in androids to effectively address the themes which Scott explores in these films.DVD format and director's cut'''

Scott is known for his enthusiasm for the DVD format, providing audio commentaries and interviews for all his films where possible. In the July 2006 issue of Total Film magazine, he stated: "After all the work we go through, to have it run in the cinema and then disappear forever is a great pity. To give the film added life is really cool for both those who missed it and those who really loved it."

Running alongside his enthusiasm for DVD, Scott is known for his use of the director's cut. The positive reaction to the Blade Runner Director's Cut encouraged Scott to re-cut several movies that were a disappointment at the time of their release (including Legend and Kingdom of Heaven), which have been met with great acclaim. Today the practice of alternative cuts is more commonplace, though often as a way to make a film stand out in the DVD marketplace by adding new material.

Filmography

Awards and honours

Scott was appointed Knight Bachelor in the 2003 New Year Honours for services to the British film industry. He received his accolade from Queen Elizabeth II at an investiture ceremony at Buckingham Palace on 8 July 2003. Scott admitted feeling "stunned and truly humbled" after the ceremony, saying, "As a boy growing up in South Shields, I could never have imagined that I would receive such a special recognition. I am truly humbled to receive this treasured award and believe it also further recognises the excellence of the British film industry."

He has been nominated for three Academy Awards for Directing—Thelma & Louise, Gladiator and Black Hawk Down—as well as three British Academy Film Awards for Best Director, four Golden Globe Awards for Best Director, and two Primetime Emmy Awards. In 1995, Ridley and his brother Tony received the BAFTA for Outstanding British Contribution To Cinema. In 2018 he received the highest accolade from BAFTA, the BAFTA Fellowship, for lifetime achievement.

Scott was inducted into the Science Fiction Hall of Fame in 2007. In 2017 the German newspaper FAZ compared Scott's influence on the science fiction film genre to Sir Alfred Hitchcock's on thrillers and John Ford's on Westerns. In 2011, he received a star on the Hollywood Walk of Fame.

Scott has received three Hugo Awards in the category of Best Dramatic Presentation for Alien, Blade Runner and The Martian. In 2012, Scott was among the British cultural icons selected by artist Sir Peter Blake to appear in a new version of his most famous artwork, the Beatles' Sgt. Pepper's Lonely Hearts Club Band'' album cover, to celebrate the British cultural figures of his life that he most admires to mark his 80th birthday. On 3 July 2015, he was awarded an honorary doctorate by the Royal College of Art in a ceremony at the Royal Albert Hall in London at which he described how he still keeps on his office wall his school report placing him 31st out of 31 in his class, and how his teacher encouraged him to pursue what became his passion at art school.

References

External links

 
 
 
 
 
 Ridley Scott Associates (RSA)
 They Shoot Pictures, Don't They?
  
 
 

 
1937 births
Living people
Alumni of the Royal College of Art
Apple Inc. advertising
BAFTA Outstanding British Contribution to Cinema Award
BAFTA fellows
British expatriates in France
British expatriates in the United States
British film directors
British film producers
British film production company founders
British television directors
British television producers
David di Donatello winners
Directors Guild of America Award winners
English-language film directors
Golden Globe Award-winning producers
Horror film directors
Hugo Award winners
Knights Bachelor
People from South Shields
Postmodernist filmmakers
Primetime Emmy Award winners
Science fiction film directors
Science Fiction Hall of Fame inductees
Ridley
Television commercial directors